Paine Ridge is a saber-shaped ridge largely composed of bare rock, extending southward from DeGoes Cliff at the southwest end of the Morozumi Range. Mapped by United States Geological Survey (USGS) from surveys and U.S. Navy air photos, 1960–63. Named by Advisory Committee on Antarctic Names (US-ACAN) for Roland D. Paine, Public Information Officer, National Science Foundation, who worked at McMurdo Station, 1960–61 and 1968–69.

References 

Ridges of Victoria Land
Pennell Coast